HD 81799 (G Hydrae) is a suspected astrometric binary star system in the equatorial constellation of Hydra. It is visible to the naked eye with an apparent visual magnitude of 4.69. It is moving further away from the Earth with a heliocentric radial velocity of 29 km/s. The system has a relatively high rate of proper motion, traversing the celestial sphere at the rate of  along a position angle of 136°.

The stellar classification of the visible component is K2+ IIIb, which matches an evolved K-type giant star. It is a red clump star, which indicates it is on the horizontal branch and is generating energy through helium fusion at its core. It is radiating 42 times the Sun's luminosity from its enlarged photosphere at an effective temperature of 4,490 K.

The system is a likely (99.4% chance) source of the X-ray emission coming from these coordinates.

References

K-type giants
Horizontal-branch stars
Astrometric binaries
Hydra (constellation)
Hydrae, G
Durchmusterung objects
081799
046371
3749